Tinsley is an English surname. Notable people with the surname include:

Annie Tinsley (1808–1885, born as Annie Turner), British novelist
April Tinsley (1980–1988), American murder victim
Beatrice Tinsley (1941–1981), British-New Zealand astronomer and cosmologist
Boyd Tinsley (born 1964), American violinist and mandolinist
Brad Tinsley (born 1989), American basketball player
Bruce Tinsley (born 1958), American cartoonist
Clarice Tinsley (born 1954), American broadcast journalist
Colin Tinsley (born 1935), English footballer
Henry Tinsley (1865–1938), English cricketer
Jamaal Tinsley (born 1978), American basketball player
Jeffrey Tinsley (born 1973), American businessman
Marion Tinsley (1927–1995), American checkers player
Pauline Tinsley (1929–2021), British soprano
Michael Tinsley (born 1984), American track and field athlete
Samuel Tinsley (1847–1903), English chess player
Theodore Tinsley (1894–1979), American author
Walter Tinsley (1891–1966), English footballer
William Tinsley (1804–1885), Irish-American architect 
William Tinsley (1831–1902), British publisher

See also
Tinsley (disambiguation)
Dawn Tinsley, fictional character in the BBC sitcom The Office
Jennifer Tinsley-Williams, a New York City Ballet dancer

English-language surnames
Surnames of English origin